Sandya Eknaligoda is a Sri Lankan human rights activist. She became an International Women of Courage Award recipient in 2017. She has been campaigning for thousands of missing  persons in Sri Lanka. She is married to missing journalist Prageeth Eknaligoda.

Her husband had told her that he was on a hit list and that he was receiving threats that warned him to stop writing. He was investigating corruption when he was kidnapped and returned in 2009. She became actively involved after her husband and prominent journalist Prageeth Eknaligoda disappeared in 2010 when he was investigating the alleged use of chemical weapons against civilians by the Sri Lankan army in the fight against the Tamil rebels.

Award 
In 2017 Eknaligoda was awarded with the  International Women of Courage Award for her campaigns. She was recognized as one of the BBC 100 Women in December 2022.

References

Sri Lankan women activists
Living people
Year of birth missing (living people)
Sri Lankan human rights activists
21st-century Sri Lankan people
21st-century Sri Lankan women
Recipients of the International Women of Courage Award
Women human rights activists
BBC 100 Women